A career break is a period of time out from employment. It is commonly used for people to take time out of their career for personal or professional development.

History
A career break is usually between one month and two years long. Six months to two years is the most common period of time for a career break. It is also possible to take a mini career break of less than one month, which enables people to try out career break activities without committing to longer periods of time. Shorter career breaks are most popular with people over 45 years of age.

It can take the form of a sabbatical, which can be paid or unpaid; unpaid sabbaticals are much more common. Sabbaticals were originally only offered to academics and clerics but are now being increasingly offered by companies.

A career break is not simply a period of unemployment. Career breakers usually do one or more of the following:
 Rest from burnout
 Travel
 Voluntary work
 Paid work abroad
 Studying or training
 Career development and business start up
 Offering palliative care
 Raising children
 Staying up-to-date with (profession related) news
 Recovering from accidents or illnesses

Usage
The career break has grown in popularity over the last several years, with 75% of the British workforce currently considering a career break. Every year, around 90,000 professionals are estimated to take a career break. It is most common in the UK, where it grew out of the gap year concept. The career break is sometimes referred to as an 'adult gap year', which reflects the commitment towards developing skills and gaining experience while out of the workforce.

In the USA a career break is generally referred to as a 'sabbatical'.

See also

 Gap year
 Sabbatical year
 Leave of absence
 On-ramping
 Work–life balance

References

Career development

it:Anno sabbatico (lavoro)